Joseph von Maier (27 April 1797 – 19 August 1873) was a German rabbi, who served as Oberkirchenrath ('High Consistorial Councillor') of the Kingdom of Württemberg.

Biography
Joseph Maier Rosenthal was born to Sara and Meier Rosenthal in 1797 in the town of Laudenbach-Fruchtlingen, near Bad Mergentheim). He attended ḥeder as a child, and went on to become a pupil at the yeshivas of Fürth and Mainz.

From the 1820s, he began working as a religious teacher, eventually in Frankfurt. After receiving his rabbinical ordination in 1827, he worked as Hausrabbiner (private rabbi) to the Kaulla banking family in Stuttgart. In 1832 he became Bezirksrabbiner (district rabbi) of that town, a position he held until his death. He was president of the first rabbinical conference held at Brunswick in 1844, and he was also a member of the Jewish Consistory of Württemberg. 

In recognition of religious and philanthropic activities, he was ennobled by King Charles of Württemberg on his seventieth birthday in 1867, and decorated with the Ritterkreuz des Württembergischen Kronordens. This gave him the distinction of being the first German rabbi belonging to the nobility.

Partial bibliography

Books and pamphlets

 
 
 
 
 
 
  With Isaac Noah Mannheimer and Gotthold Salomon.

Published eulogies

References
 

1797 births
1873 deaths
19th-century German rabbis
19th-century nobility
Chief rabbis
Clergy from Stuttgart
German nobility
People from the Kingdom of Württemberg
People from Weikersheim
University of Tübingen alumni